The 2022 CS Finlandia Trophy was held on October 4–9, 2022 in Espoo, Finland. It was part of the 2022–23 ISU Challenger Series. Medals were awarded in the disciplines of men's singles, women's singles, pairs, and ice dance.

Entries 
The International Skating Union published the list of entries on September 13, 2022.

Changes to preliminary assignments

Results

Men

Women

Pairs

Ice dance

References 

2022 in figure skating
2022 in Finnish sport
CS